The Pseudo-Jacquemart  (or Pseudo-Jacquemart de Hesdin) was an anonymous master illuminator active in Paris and Bourges between 1380 and 1415. He owed his name to his close collaboration with painter Jacquemart de Hesdin.

Biographical and stylistic elements 

The artist designated as Pseudo-Jacquemart was perhaps of Flemish origin and was active in France from the end of the 14th century to the beginning of the 15th century. Art historian Millard Meiss was the first to distinguish this artist from his contemporary colleague Jacquemart de Hesdin. Pseudo-Jacquemart seems to have been in the employ of  John, Duke of Berry, working in the shadow of other illuminators retained by the duke: Jean Pucelle, the Limbourg brothers, and Jacquemart, at the end of his career, from whom he borrowed his style. Pseudo-Jacquemart generally painted the decorations appended to miniatures: marginal scenes, small miniatures of calendars or initials for text. He also worked for other anonymous patrons on books of hours miniatures, in collaboration with other Parisian painters.

Pseudo-Jacquemart is sometimes identified with Jacquemart de Hesdin. The two painters are mentioned as working at the Palace of Poitiers at the request of John, Duke of Berry. In January 1398, a painter, named Jean de Holland, accused them of stealing pigments and models from his box. De Holland was finally killed and the two painters took refuge in the Abbey of Montierneuf at Poitiers where they were afforded asylum. The Duke of Berry eventually obtained a letter of remission for them in May 1398.

Pseudo-Jacquemart's style tended to imitate that of the painters his work supplemented, but an individualized style with a more theatrical sense of composition than seen in Jacquemart de Hesdin's work, with a more assured stroke and a brighter palette is evident.

Attributed work 
Jean Le Noir painted the calendar leafs for the Duke's Petit Heures, which Pseudo-Jacquemart may have completed.

He completed an Annunciation for the Book of hours for the use of Bourges, c. 1405–10, held at the British Library, and two miniatures for the Psalter for use in Evereux, c. 1390–1405: a jester (f.44r) and Office of the Dead (f.131r). The Getty Center, Los Angeles, holds a Book of hours with two images attributed to the artist. He also contributed three miniatures for the La Légende dorée (Golden Legend) of Jacobus de Voragine, c. 1382.

Notes

References 

 Entry in Grove Dictionary of Art (registration required)
 Getty Museum details

Further reading 
 
 

Anonymous artists
Manuscript illuminators
French artists
1300s births
1400s deaths